The 1931–32 season was the 31st season of competitive football played by Cardiff City F.C. It was the team's first season in the Third Division South of the Football League since being relegated from the Second Division during the previous season.

Background
Cardiff City played the 1931–32 season in the Third Division South of the Football League. It was the team's first season in the bottom tier of the Football League since they had joined the organisation for the 1920–21 season. The side had suffered relegation from the Second Division during the 1930–31 season after finishing bottom of the league.

Following a second relegation in three years, the club released a number of players. The most prominent of these were long-serving trio Fred Keenor, Len Davies and Harry Wake. Albert Keating was also due to be released following a doctor's report on a knee injury he had sustained, but was eventually retained for the campaign. Stewart made several new signings for the season, with Peter Ronan, Stan Holt, Owen McNally and Harry O'Neill all arriving ahead of the new campaign.

Third Division South
Cardiff began the season with a 1–0 defeat to Northampton Town on 29 August 1932 with Stewart handing debuts to four players. One of the debutants, O'Neill scored Cardiff's first goal of the campaign in the following match, a 1–1 draw against Brighton & Hove Albion two days later. Walter Robbins, the previous season's top goalscorer, netted his first goals of the campaign with a hat-trick during a 5–1 victory over Reading to open September; Jimmy McCambridge and Leslie Jones were also on the scoresheet as Cardiff recorded their first win.

Partial league table

Results by round

Fixtures and results

Third Division South

FA Cup

Welsh Cup

References
Specific 

Bibliography

 

 

Cardiff City F.C.
Cardiff City F.C. seasons
Car